Robert Armstrong (1888 or 1889–1961) was a unionist politician in Northern Ireland.

Armstrong worked as a shipyard fitter then, later, as a water superintendent.  He joined the Ulster Unionist Party and, despite having no political experience, was elected to the Senate of Northern Ireland in 1956, serving until his death in 1961.

References

1880s births
1961 deaths
Members of the Senate of Northern Ireland 1953–1957
Members of the Senate of Northern Ireland 1957–1961
Ulster Unionist Party members of the Senate of Northern Ireland
Place of birth missing
Year of birth uncertain